Arroyo Seco Raceway is a paved roadcourse style race track, located near Deming, New Mexico. It also includes a drag strip and full race course. Akela Flats is roughly between Deming and Las Cruces. The racetrack is visible to traffic traveling on I-10, just to the south of the freeway.

The roadcourse is able to be used in multiple configurations. It can be run in either clockwise or counter clockwise directions, with 2 configurations each. The result is effectively 4 different track configurations for racing.

The supermoto course is variable in configuration, but usually uses the full roadcourse and includes a motocross style track in the infield of the roadcourse. Some other configurations may be available.

The drag strip is available for competition.

References
Road Racing World: Chandler Breaks Track Record at Arroyo Seco Raceway
North American Motorsports Pages - Arroyo Seco Raceway
Trackpedia guide to driving this track
enchantment, the second largest publication in New Mexico

External links
Arroyo Seco Raceway website
AS Racing website

Buildings and structures in Luna County, New Mexico
Motorsport venues in New Mexico
Drag racing venues
Tourist attractions in Luna County, New Mexico